Year 1057 (MLVII) was a common year starting on Wednesday (link will display the full calendar) of the Julian calendar.

Events 
By place

 Byzantine Empire 
 June 8 – General Isaac Komnenos proclaims himself emperor in Paphlagonia (modern Turkey), and starts a civil war against Emperor Michael VI. He advances with a Byzantine expeditionary force towards Constantinople. At the same time, Michael sends an army against the rebels – western regiments and eastern ones (those from the Anatolic Theme and Charsianon) – to stop him.
 August 20 – Battle of Hades: Rebel forces under Isaac Komnenos defeat the Byzantines on the plains of Hades (near Nicaea). General Katakalon Kekaumenos routs the imperial right flank, and reaches the enemy's camp. He destroys the tents and supplies, which leaves the way open to Constantinople.
 September 1 – A riot in favor of Isaac Komnenos breaks out in Constantinople. Patriarch Michael I convinces Michael VI to abdicate the throne, and Isaac is crowned as emperor of the Byzantine Empire.

Europe
 August 15 – Battle of Lumphanan: King Macbeth (the Red King) is killed by Malcolm (Canmore). Macbeth is succeeded by his stepson Lulach, who is crowned (probably on September 8) as king of Scotland at Scone.
 August – Battle of Varaville: Norman forces under William (the Bastard) defeat a Franco-Angevin army at the mouth of the Dives. King Henry I on campaign in Normandy is forced to retreat his army.
 King Ferdinand I (the Great) takes the cities of Lamego and Viseu (modern Portugal), from Christian lords allied to the Muslim Taifa of Silves.

 Africa 
 The Banu Hilal razes Kairouan (in modern Tunisia). The Zirid Dynasty has to re-settle to Mahdiya (approximate date).

 Asia 
 King Anawrahta captures Thaton, the capital of the Thaton Kingdom, strengthening Theravada Buddhism in Burma.

 By topic 

 Religion 
 July 28 – Pope Victor II dies after a 15-month pontificate at Arezzo. He is succeeded by Stephen IX as the 154th pope of the Catholic Church.

Births 
 Fujiwara no Kenshi, Japanese empress (d. 1084)
 Fujiwara no Nakazane, Japanese nobleman (d. 1118)
 Hugh (the Great), French nobleman (d. 1101)
 Hugh I, French nobleman (House of Burgundy) (d. 1093)
 Rhygyfarch, bishop of St. David's (d. 1099)

Deaths 
 March 1 – Ermesinde, countess and regent of Barcelona
 April 19 – Edward the Exile, son of Edmund II (Ironside)
 June 1 – Íñigo of Oña, Spanish Benedictine abbot
 June 26 – Otto, margrave of the Nordmark
 July 28 – Victor II, pope of the Catholic Church
 August 15 – Macbeth, king of Scotland (b. before 1040)
 August 28 – Abe no Yoritoki, Japanese samurai
 August 31 – Michael VI, Byzantine emperor
 September 28 – Otto III, duke of Swabia
 November 7 – Lothair Udo I, German nobleman (b. 994)
 Abul 'Ala Al-Ma'arri, Arabian philosopher (b. 973)
 Ala al-Din Abu'l-Ghana'im Sa'd, Buyid vizier
 Bruno II, margrave of Friesland (b. 1024)
 Di Qing, Chinese general (b. 1008)
 Heca (or Hecca), bishop of Selsey
 Humphrey of Hauteville, Norman nobleman
 Jōchō Busshi, Japanese sculptor
 Leofric, English earl and peerage
 Ostromir, Russian statesman (approximate date)
 Otto I (or Odon), Italian nobleman (approximate date)
 Pandulf VI (or Pandulf V), Italian nobleman
 Ralph the Timid, Norman nobleman
 Reginald I, French nobleman (b. 986)
 William fitz Giroie, Norman nobleman

References